Sofia Arvidsson was the defending champion, but lost in the first round to Mădălina Gojnea.

Kimiko Date-Krumm won the title defeating Elena Baltacha in the final 7–6(7–3), 6–4.

Seeds

Main draw

Finals

Top half

Bottom half

References
 Main Draw
 Qualifying Draw

Internationaux Feminins de la Vienne - Singles